"Cab" is a song written and recorded by the American rock band, Train. It was released in November 2005 as the lead single from the band's fourth studio album, For Me, It's You, and was produced by Brendan O'Brien. It peaked higher on the charts than the two other radio singles from the album, "Give Myself to You" and "Am I Reaching You Now".

Background
According to Train's lead singer and frontman Pat Monahan, "Cab" and "All I Ever Wanted" were the first two songs written for the album. inspired by the emotions he felt following his divorce to ex-wife Ginean Rapp in 2004:

Monahan has likened "Cab" to being "the metaphoric song on the album". adding:

In an interview with VH1's Aaron Cummins, then-bass guitarist Johnny Colt of the Black Crowes reflected on the recording process of the track:

Reviews
The song received mostly mixed reviews by critics. AllMusic gave it a positive review, saying that the piano part is "worthy of one of Billy Joel's finest songs", and that it used "painterly synth, strummed acoustic guitars, and a killer string arrangement". It also said that it was "a fine song, but it's not the best one" on the album. Rolling Stone mentions it among the highlights of the album, saying it is "a wintry and moving vehicular metaphor".

Track listing 
 "Cab" - 3:22

Charts

Weekly charts

Year-end charts

References

2005 singles
Train (band) songs
Song recordings produced by Brendan O'Brien (record producer)
2005 songs
Columbia Records singles